The PGA Championship of Canada is a golf tournament organized by the PGA of Canada, an organization founded in 1911 at the Royal Ottawa Golf Club. It was first played in 1912 as the Canadian PGA Championship. It was a Nationwide Tour event from 2001 to 2005. Prior to that it was an event on the Canadian Tour. Stan Leonard holds the record with eight victories.

Between 1978 and 1983, the tournament was sponsored by Labatt's and titled as the Labatt's International Golf Classic with a prize fund of C$100,000. It attracted many of the leading PGA Tour players of the day, with multiple major champions Arnold Palmer, Lee Trevino (twice), Raymond Floyd and Lanny Wadkins lifting the trophy during those six years.

In 2011, the PGA Championship of Canada was reintroduced as a match play championship for the top 64 competitors on the PGA of Canada Player Rankings. The P.D. Ross Trophy was given to the winner in 1912, and is still used as the Championship's award today.

Winners

Notes

References

External links
PGA of Canada
List of winners

Golf tournaments in Canada
Former Korn Ferry Tour events
Former PGA Tour Canada events
Recurring sporting events established in 1912
1912 establishments in Canada